The Central Asia Counternarcotics Initiative (CACI) is an American proposed plan to tackle illegal drug trafficking in Central Asia. The plan was proposed during the Third Ministerial Conference of the Paris Pact Partners on Combating Illicit Traffic in Opiates Originating in Afghanistan, which took place in Vienna on 16 February 2012. 

In the runup to the February 2012 meeting, Russia managed to dissuade its Central Asian partners from accepting the plan. Russian-based critics of the scheme have argued that it is an attempt by America to increase its influence in Central Asia.

References

External links
U.S. Department of State: CACI
United States Diplomatic Mission to Kazakhstan:Central Asia Counternarcotics Initiative Fact Sheet
PenzaNews: Russia opposes new U.S. counternarcotics initiative in Central Asia 

Illegal drug trade in Asia